The Kailyard school (1880–1914) is a proposed literary movement of Scottish fiction dating from the last decades of the 19th century.

Origin and etymology
It was first given the name in an article published April 1895 in the New Review by J.H. Millar, though its editor William Ernest Henley was heavily implicated to have created the term. The term was meant as a criticism that a certain group of Scottish authors offered an overly sentimental and idyllic representation of rural life, but it was potentially more a gripe against the popularity of the authors. The name derives from the Scots "kailyaird" or "kailyard", which means a small cabbage patch (see kale) or kitchen garden, usually adjacent to a cottage; but more famously from Ian Maclaren's 1894 book Beside the Bonnie Brier Bush whose title alludes to the Jacobite song "There grows a bonnie brier bush in our Kailyard".

Writers and works
Writers who have been linked to the Kailyard school included J. M. Barrie, Ian Maclaren, J. J. Bell, George MacDonald, Gabriel Setoun, Robina F. Hardy and S. R. Crockett.

Works such as Barrie's Auld Licht Idylls (1888), A Window in Thrums (1889), and The Little Minister (1891); and Crockett's The Stickit Minister (1893) considered examples of the so called 'school'.

Criticism came from certain branches of the English literary establishment including T. W. H. Crosland and from fellow Scots such as George Douglas Brown who aimed his 1901 novel The House with the Green Shutters explicitly against what he called "the sentimental slop" of the Kailyard school. Much of Hugh MacDiarmid's work, and the Scottish Renaissance associated with him, was a reaction against Kailyardism. Ian Carter has argued that the Kailyard school reflects a sentimental structure of feeling which has deep roots in Scottish literature and can be found in the works of Burns and Scott, and that the work of William Alexander and later Scottish Renaissance writers such as Lewis Grassic Gibbon can be seen as the assertion of a democratic structure of feeling which is in tension with it.

Criticism
Scottish literary criticism right up till the 1980s used the term but critics like Andrew Nash   have argued that it was a social construct rather than an actual literary movement. The reputations, particularly of J.M. Barrie and S.R. Crockett have still to be reclaimed from what was essentially a publishing spat, directed largely against William Robertson Nicoll by English Conservative publishers in what might today be seen as an example of cultural imperialism.

References in literature
John Ashbery references the school in his book of poems, April Galleons, his protagonist lamenting mildly that "nobody I know ever talks about the Kailyard School, at least not at the dinner parties I go to".

Further reading
 Blake, George (1951), Barrie and the Kailyard School, Arthur Barker, London, 
 Campbell, Ian (1981), Kailyard: A New Assessment, Ramsay Head Press, 
 Carter, Ian R. (1982), review of "Kailyard" by Ian Campbell, in Cencrastus No. 8, Spring 1982, p. 42, 
 Harvie, Christopher (1982), Drumtochty Revisited: The Kailyard, in Lindsay, Maurice (ed.), The Scottish Review: Arts and Environment 27, August 1982, pp. 4 – 11, 
 Nash, Andrew (2007), Kailyard and Scottish Literature, Brill/Rodopi,

See also

References

External links
 Kailyard School (1886-1896), The Literary Encyclopedia
 Scots Word of the Season: Kailyard, Maggie Scott, Lecturer in English Language, University of Salford, published in The Bottle Imp ezine by the Association for Scottish Literary Studies.

 
Scottish literary movements
19th-century British literature
20th-century British literature